The Tunes of Two Cities is an album by American art rock group The Residents, released in 1982. It is part two of the Mole Trilogy.  Rather than forwarding the story of the battle between the Mole People and the Chubs, the record's concept is to display the differences between the two cultures through their music.  The music of the Chubs is light cocktail jazz, while that of the Moles tends toward industrial hymns.  A major feature of this album is that it was one of the first to use the E-mu Emulator, one of the earliest commercial digital samplers.

The Chub track "Mousetrap" bears a noticeable resemblance to Stan Kenton's "Eager Beaver." In one 1998 interview, band spokesman Homer Flynn acknowledged that the band listened to jazz big band artists including Kenton, as well as Charles Mingus and Sun Ra.

Track listing

The 1988 CD release contains three extra tracks that were excluded from the album due to space constraints. These tracks are sequenced between "Praise for the Curse" and "The Secret Seed", restoring the alternation between "Mole" and "Chub" songs.
Open Up – 2:18
Anvil Forest – 2:22
Scent of Mint – 2:27

2019 pREServed edition (Mole Box) 
A deluxe box set pertaining to the entire Mole Trilogy concept was released in 2019. It contained newly remastered editions of Mark of the Mole, The Tunes of Two Cities and The Big Bubble, as well as recordings of the Mole Show and a sixth disc of miscellaneous recordings related to the project. Disc Two is shown here for its relevance.

Personnel 
The Residents: Performance

Snakefinger: Guitar

Nessie Lessons: Vocals

Norman Salant: Saxophone

References

The Residents albums
1982 albums
Concept albums
Ralph Records albums